The following lists events that happened during 1998 in Zimbabwe.

Incumbents
 President: Robert Mugabe 
 First Vice President: Simon Muzenda
 Second Vice President: Joshua Nkomo

Events

August
 August 6 - Fighting spreads across DRC and on borders with Rwanda, Uganda and Tanzania. Rwanda continues to deny involvement with the rebels and a summit is held in Zimbabwe discussing the conflict.
 August 8 - The talks fail to secure a truce of a ceasefire between the countries at the summit in Zimbabwe.
 August 10 - Military experts from Namibia, Zimbabwe, Zambia and Tanzania are due in Kinshasa later this week to investigate allegations of Rwandan and Ugandan troops being sent across the border.
 August 21 - South African President Nelson Mandela calls for a summit over the Congo conflict on Saturday, inviting the leaders of DRC, Rwanda, Uganda and Zimbabwe to come.
 August 27 - After over two hundred civilians are reported to be killed by DRC rebels, Zimbabwe criticises countries that have been secretly aiding the rebels, who called for a ceasefire.

September
 September 3 - South Africa now says it supports the intervention of DRC by Namibia, Zimbabwe and Angola, supporting Kabila.

December
 December 4 - Zimbabwean President Robert Mugabe defends fighting for DRC, referring to the foreign involvement in Bosnian War.
 December 5 - The rebel leader said that Angolan and Zimbabwean troops have launched a counter-offensive against his troops in the northwest of the Democratic Republic of the Congo.

References

 
1990s in Zimbabwe
Years of the 20th century in Zimbabwe
Zimbabwe
Zimbabwe